Fit TV was a French TV channel of AB Groupe dedicated to fitness.

History
The channel was originally broadcast only on AB Sat, and then through a subscription on certain networks of cable operators and digital broadcasting TV packages.

It was broadcast from 7:30 am to 9 am on the same channel as Toute l'Histoire. Since the channel has stopped broadcasting 2007 without any explanation from AB Groupe, the Conseil supérieur de l'audiovisuel (CSA) was obliged to withdraw the authorization issued for Fit TV in November 2009.

Programming
It was a channel devoted solely to fitness and was still re-broadcasting the same program loops from 1997 on.

References

External links

Mediawan Thematics
Defunct television channels in France
Television channels and stations established in 1996
Television channels and stations disestablished in 2007
1996 establishments in France
2007 disestablishments in France